Johan Wiklander (born June 9, 1981) is a Swedish former professional ice hockey player. He most notably played with Örebro HK of the Swedish Hockey League (SHL).

Wiklander made his Elitserien debut playing with Södertälje SK during the 2007–08 Elitserien season.

References

External links

1981 births
Living people
HC Alleghe players
Bofors IK players
Huddinge IK players
HC TWK Innsbruck players
Örebro HK players
IK Oskarshamn players
Södertälje SK players
Swedish ice hockey forwards